Bae Min-hee (born July 11, 1988) is a South Korean handball player who competed at the 2008 Summer Olympics.

In 2008, she won a bronze medal with the South Korean team.

External links
The Official Website of the Beijing 2008 Olympic Games

Living people
South Korean female handball players
Olympic handball players of South Korea
Handball players at the 2008 Summer Olympics
Olympic bronze medalists for South Korea
Olympic medalists in handball
Medalists at the 2008 Summer Olympics
1988 births
Asian Games medalists in handball
Handball players at the 2010 Asian Games
Asian Games bronze medalists for South Korea
Medalists at the 2010 Asian Games
Sportspeople from Gyeonggi Province
20th-century South Korean women
21st-century South Korean women